Hazelwood is a neighborhood in the Northeast and Southeast sections of Portland, Oregon. Prior being annexed by Portland, the community was enumerated as a "Census-designated place".

The community recorded a population of 25,541 in 1980, 11,480 in 1990, 19,916 in 2000, and 23,462 in 2010.

See also
 Mall 205
 Sayler's Old Country Kitchen

References

External links
 Guide to Hazelwood Neighborhood (PortlandNeighborhood.com)
Hazelwood Street Tree Inventory Report

Neighborhoods in Portland, Oregon
Former census-designated places in Oregon